Mas‘ūd ibn Idrīs ibn Ḥasan ibn Abī Numayy was Emir of Mecca and ruler of the Hejaz from 1629 to 1630.

Kansuh Pasha, governor of Yemen, installed Mas'ud as Emir on Sunday, 5 Safar 1039 (23 September 1629), after assassinating Ahmad ibn Abd al-Muttalib.

Mas'ud died in Mecca of tuberculosis on Tuesday night, 28 Rabi II 1040 AH (the night of 2–3 December 1630). His funeral prayer was performed in the Masjid al-Haram, and he was buried in the qubba of Khadijah. The year of his death is recorded numerically in the poet's verse:

Notes

References
 
 

 
 

Sharifs of Mecca
Banu Qatadah
1630 deaths
17th-century Arabs